The Hôtel Baudard de Saint-James is a former hôtel particulier located at no 12, place Vendôme in the 1st arrondissement of Paris.

Built in 1702, for the doctor of the Sorbonne, Louis Dublineau, by the architect Jacques V Gabriel, it owes its name to Claude Baudard de Saint-James, who was its second owner.

The hotel has decorations created in 1777 by François-Joseph Bélanger and the painter Jean-Jacques Lagrenée.

In 1849, the Polish composer Chopin died at the Hôtel Baudard de Saint-James.

It is now owned by the Crédit Foncier de France and is occupied by the jeweler Chaumet.

References 

Houses completed in 1702